Brendan Moriarty (born 1989) is an American film director and producer. Moriarty directed his first film at the age of 20, The Road to Freedom, a war drama film about photojournalist Sean Flynn, who went missing in 1971 in Cambodia while on assignment for Time magazine. 

Moriarty has been awarded in the National Museum in Kampot for his first film. He has also served as media advisor on numerous projects in Asia and around the world.

Further reading

External links

1989 births
American film directors
American film producers
Living people